Zaeeropsis lepida is a species of beetle in the family Cerambycidae. It was first described by Ernst Friedrich Germar in 1848 as Anaesthetis lepida. It is known from Australia. The Australian Faunal Directory recognises Rhytophora lepida as the accepted name for this species.

References

Pteropliini
Beetles described in 1848